Oscar de Minerbi (26 February 1908 – 1951) was an Italian tennis player.

Born in Paris, de Minerbi hailed from an Italian Jewish noble family, with origins in Trieste. He was the son of tennis player and politician Lionello de Minerbi. On his father's side he was related to the Stern family.

De Minerbi was Italy's national singles champion in 1931 and played Davis Cup tennis the following year. He was a semi-finalist at the Italian International Championships and made it as far as the third round at Roland Garros.

Post tennis, de Minerbi had a career as a diplomat. He had a daughter named Diana who married the son of Scottish Argentine socialite Adelina Munro Drysdale and the Duke of Rignano.

See also
List of Italy Davis Cup team representatives

References

External links
 
 
 

1908 births
1951 deaths
Italian male tennis players
Jewish tennis players
20th-century Italian Jews
Tennis players from Paris